{{Infobox officeholder
| name                = Albert Kalonji
| image               = Albert Kalonji.jpg
| office1             = Head of State of South Kasai<small>(first as President, later as Mulopwe/God-king/Emperor)</small>
| term_start1         = 9 August 1960
| term_end1           = 5 October 1962
| predecessor1        = Edmond Mukanya Mulenda
| successor1          = position disestablished| birth_date          = 
| birth_place         = Hemptinne (near Luluabourg), Belgian Congo(Now Katende, Haut-Lomami, Democratic Republic of the Congo)
| birth_name          = 
| death_date          = 
| death_place         = Mbuji-Mayi, Democratic Republic of the Congo
| party               = Mouvement National Congolais-Kalonji (MNC-K)
}}

Albert Kalonji Ditunga (6 June 1929 – 20 April 2015)Décès de M. Albert Kalonji Ditunga Mulopwe  Agence Congolaise de Presse. 30 May 2015  was a Congolese politician best known as the leader of the short-lived secessionist state of South Kasai (Sud-Kasaï) during the Congo Crisis.

 Early life 
Little is known about Albert Kalonji's early life. He was born in 1927 or 1929 in Hemptinne, Kasai Province, Belgian Congo. He attended Scheut Missionaries-run Catholic schools in Lusambo before studying at an agricultural school in Kisantu for five years.

Early career

Kalonji, a chief from the Luba ethnic group, began his political career under Belgian colonial rule as a member of the nationalist Mouvement National Congolais (MNC) party led by Patrice Lumumba. Kalonji, however, split with Lumumba to form a federalist faction of the party, known as the Mouvement National Congolais-Kalonji (MNC-K), which failed to achieve significant success while Lumumba was made Prime Minister of the independent Congo in 1960.

South Kasai

Within days of being independent from Belgium, the new Republic of the Congo found itself torn between competing political factions, as well as by foreign interference. As the situation deteriorated, Moise Tshombe declared the independence of Katanga Province as the State of Katanga on 11 July 1960.

Kalonji, claiming that the Baluba were being persecuted in the Congo and needed their own state in their traditional Kasai homeland, followed suit shortly afterwards and declared the autonomy of the diamond-rich South Kasai on 8 August, with himself as head. Unlike Tshombe, Kalonji shrank from declaring full independence from the Congo and rather declared its "autonomy" with a hypothetical, federalised Congo. He, as representatives of his party, continued to sit in the Congolese parliaments in Léopoldville.

In emulation of Winston Churchill, he adopted the V sign for victory to express his confidence in South Kasai's ability to achieve its goals.

On 12 April 1961, Kalonji's father was granted the title Mulopwe (which roughly translates to "emperor" or "god-king"), but he immediately "abdicated" in favor of his son. On 16 July, In April 1961, Kalonji took the royal title Mulopwe ("King of the Baluba") to tie the state more closely to the pre-colonial Luba Empire. The act divided the South Kasaian authorities and Kalonji was disavowed by the majority of South Kasai's parliamentary representatives in Léopoldville.[d] The move was controversial with members of Kalonji's own party and cost him much support.

Kalonji's reign, however, proved to be short-lived. As preparation for the invasion of Katanga, Congolese government troops invaded and occupied South Kasai, becoming involved in ethnic-based violence and displacing thousands of Baluba. On 30 December, Kalonji was arrested. He did manage to escape shortly afterwards. The administrative apparatus of South Kasai survived, under Congolese occupation, until a coup d'état was led against Kalonjists by the state's Prime Minister, Joseph Ngalula, in October 1962 when the state returned to the Congo.

Legacy and subsequent activities

Escaping from arrest, Kalonji fled to Francoist Spain. He returned to the Congo between 1964-65 to hold a ministerial portfolio in the central government led by Tshombe but returned to exile following Joseph-Désiré Mobutu's 1965 coup d'état, which ended his political career. Under Mobutu, the territory of South Kasai was divided into two regions to discourage future secessionist tendencies. 

In exile in Europe, Kalonji still claimed the title Souverain Possesseur des Terres occupées par les Balubas (Sovereign Owner of the Lands occupied by the Baluba). He wrote about his experiences in Memorandum: Ma lutte, au Kasai, pour la Verité au service de la Justice ("Memorandum: My fight in Kasai in the Service of Truth and Justice", published 1964) and Congo 1960. La Sécession du Sud-Kasaï. La vérité du Mulopwe'' ("Congo 1960. The South Kasai Secession. Truth from the Mulopwe", published 2005). He died in April 2015 and was buried in Katende.

Notes

References

Bibliography

External links
RDC: décès d'Albert Kalonji Mulopwe at Radio Okapi

1929 births
2015 deaths
African monarchs
People from Kasaï-Central
Luba people
Mouvement National Congolais politicians
Heads of state of former countries
Heads of state of states with limited recognition
Democratic Republic of the Congo anti-communists
People of the Congo Crisis
Governors of provinces of the Democratic Republic of the Congo
Pretenders
Self-proclaimed monarchy
21st-century Democratic Republic of the Congo people